Richard Rock (born 6 November 1957) is a Canadian athlete. He competed in the men's long jump at the 1976 Summer Olympics.

References

External links
 

1957 births
Living people
Athletes (track and field) at the 1976 Summer Olympics
Athletes (track and field) at the 1978 Commonwealth Games
Athletes (track and field) at the 1979 Pan American Games
Commonwealth Games competitors for Canada
Pan American Games track and field athletes for Canada
Canadian male long jumpers
Olympic track and field athletes of Canada
Track and field athletes from Ontario
Black Canadian track and field athletes
Sportspeople from Reading, Berkshire
English emigrants to Canada